Arthur J. Deikman (September 27, 1929 – September 2, 2013) was a clinical professor of psychiatry at the University of California, San Francisco, and a member of the editorial board of the Journal of Humanistic Psychology and Human Givens. He was also a contributor to The Journal of Nervous and Mental Disease.

Life and work
Born in New York City as the son of a businessman and raised in Long Island, Deikman studied physics at Harvard University. He then moved to mathematics, and then to pre-med classes. He traces his choice of psychiatry to an encounter with a doctor who gave him a physical exam prior to his entry to  Harvard Medical School: "When I told him I liked Rilke and Yeats, he told me I was going to be a psychiatrist. It gave me the most freedom. I could get research grants because anything could be considered part of the mind." On a two-month summer vacation which he spent camping alone in the Adirondacks, another experience occurred that was to determine the direction his life took: "I sat on a rock by a lake and tried to get closer to what I felt in music and poetry. After two weeks of that, colors became brighter. Something emanated from the sky and trees. I knew other people weren't experiencing it. This seemed very important."

Intrigued by this altered awareness, Deikman became a pioneering investigator of mystical states in the 1950s and in the following decade created a humane form of psychotherapeutic treatment for patients with psychosis. He also became a student of zen meditation under Suzuki Roshi, of Sufism under Idries Shah, and explored the Human Potential Movement with Esalen leaders George Leonard and Michael Murphy.

In the early 1970s, Deikman famously identified the syndrome of "mystical psychosis" to characterize first-person accounts of psychotic experiences that are strikingly similar to reports of mystical experiences. According to Deikman, psychotic experience need not be considered pathological, especially if consideration is given to the values and beliefs of the individual concerned. Deikman thought the mystical experience was brought about through a "deautomatization" or undoing of habitual psychological structures that organize, limit, select, and interpret perceptual stimuli, possible causes of such deautomatization including exposure to severe stress, substance abuse or withdrawal, and mood disorders.

Deikman took part in a one-year research seminar on new religious movements in order to gain a better understanding of the attraction these movements had exercised on many Americans in the 1960s and 1970s. In 1990, he wrote The Wrong Way Home: Uncovering the Patterns of Cult Behavior in American Society.  Deikman observed that "behavior similar to that which takes place in extreme cults takes place in all of us," and suggested that "the longing for parents persists into adulthood and results in cult behavior that pervades normal society."

Arthur J. Deikman died on September 2, 2013, at his home in Mill Valley, CA after "a brave and patient encounter" with Parkinson's disease.  At his side (since the 1950s) was his wife, abstract artist Etta Deikman.

Education
Harvard College
Harvard Medical School
Board Certified, Psychiatry, Neurology, American Board of Psychiatry and Neurology

Published works

Books
Personal Freedom: On Finding Your Way to the Real World, 1976
The Observing Self, 1983
Evaluating Spiritual and Utopian Groups, 1988
The Wrong Way Home: Uncovering the Patterns of Cult Behavior in American Society, 1990
Them and Us: Cult Thinking and the Terrorist Threat, 2003, excerpted

Articles
Arthur Deikman on Mystic Experience, "Mystic Experience and Two Modes of Consciousness", adapted from the work of Arthur J. Deikman, M.D.Article, Journal of Consciousness Studies, 1996
I = Awareness, Journal of Consciousness Studies, 3 (4), pp. 350–6.
Spirituality Expands a Therapist's Horizons
 
Treating Former Members of Cults

References

External links
Dr. Arthur Deikman, author's personal website
Interviewed at his home by DC on December 21, 1997, Crooked CucumberThe Human Givens Institute, "Exploring the Cult in Culture"
Commentary on Deikman's Essays - "Deautomatization and the Mystic Experience", "Bimodal Consciousness and the Mystic Experience", Sandra Stahlman, 1992
Demystifying cults: Psychiatrist analyzes why people join groups, Interview in the Marin Independent Journal''

American psychiatrists
Harvard Medical School alumni
University of California, San Francisco faculty
Sufi psychology
1929 births
2013 deaths
Harvard College alumni
People associated with The Institute for Cultural Research